Allopathes desbonni is a species of coral in the family Antipathidae. The species is known from the Gulf of Mexico and from near the Lesser Antilles (West Central Atlantic Ocean).

References

Antipathidae
Cnidarians of the Atlantic Ocean
Cnidarians of the Caribbean Sea
Biota of the Gulf of Mexico
Marine fauna of North America
Marine fauna of South America
Corals described in 1864